Freycinet may refer to:

People
Charles de Freycinet (1828–1923), French prime minister
Louis de Freycinet (1779–1842), French Navy officer
Rose de Freycinet (1794-1832), diarist and wife of Louis.

Places
Cape Freycinet, Western Australia
Henri Freycinet Harbour, Western Australia
Freycinet Island, Western Australia
Freycinet National Park, Tasmania
Freycinet Peninsula, Tasmania 

Other
Freycinet gauge, standard governing the dimensions of the locks of some canals.